The Ahja is a river in Estonia. The river begins at Lake Erastvere and empties into the River Emajõgi.

Gallery

External links 

Rivers of Estonia